Apollo High School refers to:

In India 
Apollo High School (Bangalore) in HeganaHalli Famous School of Manjunath.V

In the United States 
Apollo High School (Arizona), Glendale, Arizona
Apollo High School (Kentucky), Owensboro, Kentucky
Apollo High School (Minnesota), St. Cloud, Minnesota
Apollo High School (Pennsylvania), Apollo, Pennsylvania
Apollo High School (San Jose, California)
Apollo High School (Simi Valley, California)